The Trail of the Lonesome Pine may refer to:
 The Trail of the Lonesome Pine (novel), 1908, by John Fox, Jr.
 Other works inspired by the novel:
 The Trail of the Lonesome Pine, a 1912 stage adaptation by Eugene Walter
 "The Trail of the Lonesome Pine" (song), 1913
Trail of the Lonesome Pine, a Laurel and Hardy compilation album containing the song of the same name
 The Trail of the Lonesome Pine (1916 film)
 The Trail of the Lonesome Pine (1923 film)
 The Trail of the Lonesome Pine (1936 film)